Milind Rege (born 16 February 1949) is a former Indian first-class cricketer who played for Bombay cricket team from 1967/68 to 1977/78. He is the chairman of selectors with the Mumbai Cricket Association. He also works as the head of Corporate Communications, Administration and Personnel functions of Tata Steel at its Mumbai head office.

Early life 
He graduated from St. Xavier's College.

Career
Rege played as a bowling all-rounder who batted right-handed and bowled right-arm off break. He represented Bombay in domestic cricket and appeared in 52 first-class matches between 1967/68. He also captained Bombay in a few matches and played for West Zone cricket team.

Rege continued to be associated with Mumbai cricket after retirement. He worked for various subcommittees of the Mumbai Cricket Association for over 20 years. Having worked as a Mumbai selector since the 1980s, he was appointed chairman of selectors in 2011. He resigned from the post in 2012 but continued to be a member of the four-man panel. He was reinstated at the position of chairman in 2015.

He has been the secretary of the Tata Sports Club for more than two decades and the president of Association of Cricket Umpires of Mumbai and Member Secretary of the Cricket Improvement Committee. He is also the West Zone representative of the Media Committee for the Board of Control for Cricket in India.

Rege has been working for Tata Steel as the head of corporate communications for more than a decade at its Mumbai head office. He was previously the senior divisional manager at the company.

References

External links 
 
 

1949 births
Living people
Indian cricketers
Mumbai cricketers
West Zone cricketers
St. Xavier's College, Mumbai alumni